"Fine Line" is a song by English singer and songwriter Mabel featuring British rapper Not3s. The song peaked at number 11 on the UK Singles Chart, becoming her second UK hit after "Finders Keepers". The song was included as a track on the 2018 reissue of Mabel's debut mixtape, Ivy to Roses, as well as her debut studio album, High Expectations.

Track listing
Digital download
"Fine Line" – 3:31

Digital download
"Fine Line" (Remix) (featuring Tory Lanez) – 3:31

Digital download
"Fine Line" (Remix) (Mabel and WSTRN) – 3:39

Digital download
"Fine Line" (James Hype Remix) – 3:24

Digital download
"Fine Line" (Snakehips Remix) – 3:33

Credits and personnel

 Mabel McVey – vocals, composition
 JD. Reid – composition
 Marlon Roudette – composition
 Errol Bellot – composition
 Steven Marsden – composition
 Not3s – vocals

Charts

Weekly charts

Year-end charts

Certifications

References

2018 singles
2018 songs
Mabel (singer) songs
Not3s songs
Songs written by Mabel (singer)
Songs written by Marlon Roudette
Songs written by Not3s